Rosenfeld is a German name meaning "rose field" or "field of roses"

It may refer to:

Places
 Rosenfeld, Germany, a town in Baden-Württemberg
 Rosenfeld, Manitoba, a Canadian village in the Rural Municipality of Rhineland
 Rosenfeld (Melk), a village in the municipality of Melk, Lower Austria
 Rosenfeld, Texas, an unincorporated community in west central Brewster County
 Dr. James Rosenfeld House in southwest Portland, Oregon
 Heiser, Rosenfeld, and Strauss Buildings in Baltimore, Maryland

Surname
 Albert Rosenfeld (1885–1970), Australian rugby league footballer
 Alexandra Rosenfeld (born 1986), elected "Miss France" in 2006
 Andrée Rosenfeld (1934-2008), Belgian rock art researcher and archaeologist
 Andrew Rosenfeld (1962–2015), British businessman
 Arthur Rozenfeld (born 1995), French basketball player in the Israeli Basketball Premier League
 Arthur H. Rosenfeld (1926–2017), energy conservationist
 Rosenfeld Effect
 Rosenfeld's law 
 Azriel Rosenfeld (1931–2004), American informatics professor
 Bella Rosenfeld (1895–1944), Yiddish picture book writer
 Bobbie Rosenfeld (1904–1969), Canadian olympic athlete
 Bobbie Rosenfeld Award, annual award given to Canada's female athlete of the year
 Bobbie Rosenfeld Park in Toronto, Canada
 Bryan Rosenfeld (born 1965), Canadian soccer player and coach
 Dagmar Rosenfeld (born 1974), German journalist
 Daniel Rosenfeld (born 1989), German musician
 Eva Rosenfeld (1892–1977), German-British psychoanalyst
 Gastão Rosenfeld (1912–1990), Brazilian physician and biomedical scientist
 Gavriel David Rosenfeld, American historian
 Harry M. Rosenfeld (1929–2021), American newspaper editor
 Irene Rosenfeld (born 1953), American current CEO of Mondelēz International
 Isaac Rosenfeld (1918-1956), Jewish-American writer
 Jakob Rosenfeld (1903–1952), Austrian physician
 Jesse Rosenfeld (born 1983), Australian actor
 Jim Rosenfeld (born 1958), American local television news anchor
 Léon Rosenfeld (1904–1974), Belgian physicist
 Belinfante–Rosenfeld stress–energy tensor
 Lotty Rosenfeld (1943–2020), Chilean artist
 Lou Rosenfeld, American publisher specializing in design books
 Morris Rosenfeld (1862–1923), Yiddish playwright
 Marina Rosenfeld, New York City experimental composer and turntablist
 Michael S. Rosenfeld (1934–2010), talent agent, movie producer, and co-founder of Creative Artists Agency
 Oskar Rosenfeld (1884–1944), Austrian-Jewish writer 
 Otto Rosenfeld (disambiguation), several people
 Richard Rosenfeld (born 1952), American criminologist and academic
 Roni Rosenfeld (born 1959), Israeli-American computer scientist
 Šandor Friedrich Rosenfeld (1872–1945), Austrian-Jewish writer
 Scott Ian Rosenfeld (born 1963), American metal rhythm guitarist
 Sharon Rosenfeld, real name of Filipina actress Nikka Valencia
 Stephen Rosenfeld (1932–2010), American journalist
 Win Rosenfeld (born 1978), American screenwriter and producer

See also
 Rosenfelder
 Rosenfield
 Rozenfeld

German-language surnames
Jewish surnames
Yiddish-language surnames